Berrick Trench is a  biological Site of Special Scientific Interest north of Nettlebed in Oxfordshire.

This is an ancient semi-natural beech wood on the slope of a dry valley in the Upper Chalk. There are many stools of ash, oak, beech, whitebeam, field maple and hazel. Woodland flowering plants include  early purple orchid and  early dog-violet.

References

 
Sites of Special Scientific Interest in Oxfordshire